The Constitution of Namibia is the supreme law of the Republic of Namibia. Adopted on 9 February 1990, a month prior to Namibia's independence from apartheid South Africa, it was written by an elected constituent assembly.

Preamble
"Whereas recognition of the inherent dignity and the equal and inalienable rights of all members of the human family is indispensable for freedom, justice and peace; Whereas the said rights include the right of the individual to life, liberty and the pursuit of happiness, regardless of race, colour, ethnic origin, sex, religion, creed or social or economic status; Whereas the said rights are most effectively maintained and protected in a democratic society, where the government is responsible to freely elected representatives of the people, operating under a sovereign constitution and a free and independent judiciary;
Whereas these rights have for so long been denied to the people of Namibia by colonialism, racism and apartheid;
Whereas we the people of Namibia -
have finally emerged victorious in our struggle against colonialism, racism and apartheid;
are determined to adopt a Constitution which expresses for ourselves and our children our resolve to cherish and to protect the gains of our long struggle; desire to promote amongst all of us the dignity of the individual and the unity and integrity of the Namibian nation among and in association with the nations of the world; will strive to achieve national reconciliation and to foster peace, unity and a common loyalty to a single state;
committed to these principles, have resolved to constitute the Republic of Namibia as a sovereign, secular, democratic and unitary State securing to all our citizens justice, liberty, equality, and fraternity.
Now therefore, we the people of Namibia accept and adopt this Constitution as the fundamental law of our Sovereign and Independent Republic."

Chapters

The Constitution consists of 21 chapters totaling 148 articles.

Chapter I  The Republic

Article 1  Establishment of the Republic of Namibia and Identification of its Territory

Article 2  National Symbols

Article 3  Language

Chapter II  Citizenship

Article 4  Acquisition and loss of Citizenship

Chapter III  Fundamental Human Rights and Freedoms

Article 5  Protection of Fundamental Rights and Freedoms

Article 6  Protection of Life

Article 7  Protection and Liberty

Article 8  Respect for Human Dignity

Chapter IV  Public Emergency, State of National Defence and Martial Law

Chapter V  The President

Chapter VI  The Cabinet

Chapter VII  The National Assembly

Chapter VIII  The National Council

Chapter IX  The Administration of Justice

Chapter X  The Ombudsman

Chapter XI  Principles of State Policy

Chapter XII  Regional and Local Government

Chapter XIII  The Public Service Commission

Chapter XIV  The Security Commission

Chapter XV  The Police and Defence Forces and the Prison Service

Chapter XVI  Finance

Chapter XVII  Central Bank and National Planning Commission

Chapter XVIII  Coming into Force of the Constitution

Chapter XX  The Law in Force and Transitional Provisions

Chapter XXI  Final Provisions

Chapter 2, consisting of the single Article 4, is the major source of Namibian nationality law.

Amendments
Prior to the 2014 general elections, the Constitution was amended to increase the size of the Parliament. The amendment saw an increase in the National Assembly from 78 seats (72 elected, 6 appointed by the President) to 104 seats (96 elected, 8 appointed). The National Council increased from 26 seats (two representatives from 13 regions) to 42 seats (three representatives from 14 regions, Kavango was split into Kavango East and Kavango West). This  expansion was introduced to allow for wider representation of the population, although the real reason behind it was the newly introduced gender equality system of the ruling party SWAPO. This system would have pushed several male members out of parliament. These changes were approved against the votes of opposition parties, as SWAPO had a two-thirds majority in Parliament.

References

External links
 
 Constitution of Namibia 
 First Amendment
 Second Amendment
 Third Amendment

Namibia
Law of Namibia
1990 in Namibia